Whitehead Hicks (August 24, 1728 – October 4, 1780) was the 42nd Mayor of New York City from 1766 to 1776.

Hicks came from a Quaker family which settled and lent its name to Hicksville, New York. Hicks studied law under William Smith and was admitted to practice in 1750. The son of Judge Thomas Hicks, he was a lawyer and served on the New York Supreme Court of Judicature. He married Charlotte Brevoort, the daughter of John and Louisa (Kockerman) Brevoort.

Hicks was a Loyalist and was the first to appear in front of a committee of nine colonials formed by the New York Provincial Congress in 1776 to investigate "domestic enemies" "disaffected to the American cause". He met with this committee on June 15, 1776, indicating his loyalty to the king and was subsequently put on parole.

After resigning from the mayoralty, he served as a judge before eventually retiring to his farm on Long Island where he died at 52 years old in 1780.

He was the first mayor to be born in what is now modern-day Queens.

References

1728 births
1780 deaths
Loyalists in the American Revolution from New York (state)
Mayors of New York City
People from Flushing, Queens
People of the Province of New York